Riqueuria is a monotypic genus of flowering plants belonging to the family Rubiaceae. It only contains one known species, Riqueuria avenia Ruiz & Pav.

It is native to Peru. It is found in groves or forests.

The genus name of Riqueuria is in honour of Ludovico Riqueur (d. 1737), a court apothecary during the time of Philip V of Spain and was also a cultivator of exotic trees. The reason for the Latin specific epithet of avenia has not been published.
It was first described and published in Fl. Peruv. Prodr. on page 18 in 1794. The species was published in Fl. Peruv. Vol.1 on page 70 in 1798.

References

Rubiaceae
Rubiaceae genera
Plants described in 1794
Flora of Peru